Yevlax Airport  is an airport serving the city of Yevlax in Azerbaijan.

See also
List of airports in Azerbaijan

Airports in Azerbaijan